Winchester is a cathedral city in Hampshire, England. The city lies at the heart of the wider City of Winchester, a local government district, at the western end of the South Downs National Park, on the River Itchen. At the 2011 census, Winchester had a population of 45,184. The wider City of Winchester district, which includes towns such as Alresford and Bishop's Waltham, has a population of 116,595. Winchester is the county town of Hampshire and contains the head offices of Hampshire County Council.

Winchester developed from the Roman town of Venta Belgarum, which in turn developed from an Iron Age oppidum. Winchester was one of the most important cities in England until the Norman conquest in the eleventh century. It has since become one of the most expensive and affluent areas in the United Kingdom.

The city's major landmark is Winchester Cathedral. The city is also home to the University of Winchester and Winchester College, the oldest public school in the United Kingdom still using its original buildings.

History

Prehistory
The area around Winchester has been inhabited since prehistoric times, with three Iron Age hillforts, Oram's Arbour, St. Catherine's Hill, and Worthy Down all nearby. In the Late Iron Age, a more urban settlement type developed, known as an oppidum, although the archaeology of this phase remains obscure.

The settlement became an important centre for the British Belgae tribe; however, it remains unclear how the Belgae came to control the initial settlement. Caesar recorded the tribe had crossed the channel as raiders (probably in the 1st century BCE), only to later establish themselves. The Roman account of continental invaders has been challenged in recent years with scientific studies favouring a gradual change through increased trade links rather than migration.

To the Celtic Britons, the settlement was likely known as Wentā or Venta (from a common Celtic word meaning "tribal town" or "meeting place"). An etymology connected with the Celtic word for "white" (Modern Welsh gwyn) has been suggested, due to Winchester's situation upon chalk. It was the Latinised versions of this name, together with that of the tribe that gave the town its Roman name of Venta Belgarum.

Roman period

After the Roman conquest of Britain, the settlement served as the capital of the Belgae and was distinguished as Venta Belgarum, "Venta of the Belgae". Although in the early years of the Roman province it was of subsidiary importance to Silchester and Chichester, Venta eclipsed them both by the latter half of the second century. At the beginning of the third century, Winchester was given protective stone walls. There was a limited suburban area outside the walls. Like many other Roman towns however, Winchester began to decline in the later fourth century.

Medieval period

Post-Roman Winchester
Despite the Roman withdrawal from Britain, urban life continued much as it had done into the mid fifth century. The settlement reduced in size, but work was carried out to improve the city's defences. The city may have functioned as a centre for a religious community or a royal palace, as they continued to use the Christian cemeteries established in the Roman period.

Winchester appears in early Welsh literature and is commonly identified as the city of  listed among the 28 cities of Britain in the History of the Britons (commonly attributed to Nennius). The city is known as Caerwynt in Modern Welsh.

Between 476 and 517 AD, the town and surrounding areas seems to have been fortified by several Jutish settlements  and to have operated as part of a larger polity.

Kingdom of Wessex

The city became known as Wintanceaster ("Fort Venta") in Old English. In 648, King Cenwalh of Wessex erected the Church of St Peter and St Paul, later known as the Old Minster. This became a cathedral in the 660s when the West Saxon bishop's see was transferred from Dorchester-on-Thames. The present form of the city dates from reconstruction in the late 9th century, when King Alfred the Great obliterated the Roman street plan in favour of a new grid in order to provide better defence against the Vikings. The city's first mint appears to date from this period.

In the early 10th century there were two new ecclesiastical establishments: the convent of Nunnaminster, founded by Alfred's widow Ealhswith, and the New Minster. Bishop Æthelwold of Winchester was a leading figure in the monastic reform movement of the later 10th century. He expelled the secular canons of both minsters and replaced them with monks. He created the drainage system, the "Lockburn", which served as the town drain until 1875, and still survives. Also in the late 10th century, the Old Minster was enlarged as a centre of the cult of the 9th century Bishop of Winchester, Saint Swithun. The three minsters were the home of what architectural historian John Crook describes as "the supreme artistic achievements" of the Winchester School.

The consensus among historians of Anglo-Saxon England is that the court was mobile in this period and there was no fixed capital. Martin Biddle has suggested that Winchester was a centre for royal administration in the 7th and 8th centuries, but this is questioned by Barbara Yorke, who sees it as significant that the shire was named after Hamtun, the forerunner of Southampton. However, Winchester is described by the historian Catherine Cubitt as "the premier city of the West Saxon kingdom" and Janet Nelson describes London and Winchester as Alfred the Great's "proto-capitals".

There was a fire in the city in 1141 during the Rout of Winchester. In the 14th century, William of Wykeham played a role in the city's restoration. As Bishop of Winchester he was responsible for much of the current structure of the cathedral, and he founded the still extant public school Winchester College. During the Middle Ages, the city was an important centre of the wool trade, before going into a slow decline. The curfew bell in the bell tower (near the clock in the picture), still sounds at 8:00 pm each evening.

Jews in Winchester

Jews lived in Winchester from at least 1148, and in the 13th century the Jewish community in the city was one of the most important in England. There was an archa in the city, and the Jewish quarter was located in the city's heart (present day Jewry street). There were a series of blood libel claims against the Jewish community in the 1220s and 1230s, which likely was the cause of the hanging of the community's leader, Abraham Pinch, in front of the synagogue of which he was the head. Simon de Montfort ransacked the Jewish quarter in 1264, and in 1290 all Jews were expelled from England.

Modern period

The City Cross (also known as the Buttercross) has been dated to the 15th century, and features 12 statues of the Virgin Mary, other saints and various historical figures. Several statues appear to have been added throughout the structure's history. In 1770, Thomas Dummer purchased the Buttercross from the Corporation of Winchester, intending to have it re-erected at Cranbury Park, near Otterbourne. When his workmen arrived to dismantle the cross, they were prevented from doing so by the people of the city, who "organised a small riot", and they were forced to abandon their task. The agreement with the city was cancelled and Dummer erected a lath and plaster facsimile, which stood in the park for about sixty years before it was destroyed by the weather. The Buttercross itself was restored by George Gilbert Scott in 1865, and still stands in the High Street. It is now a Scheduled Ancient Monument.

A large portion of the city walls, built on Roman foundations, were demolished in the 18th and 19th centuries as they fell into ruin and the gates became a barrier to traffic and a danger to pedestrians, with only a small portion of the original Roman wall itself surviving. Of the six gates (North, South, East, West, Durn, and King's Gates), only the Kingsgate and Westgate survive, with sections of the walls remaining around the two gates and near the ruins of Wolvesey Castle.

Three notable bronze sculptures can be seen in or from the High Street by major sculptors of the 19th and 20th centuries, the earliest a monumental statue of Queen Victoria, now in the Great Hall, by Sir Alfred Gilbert (also known as the sculptor of 'Eros' in London's Piccadilly Circus), King Alfred, facing the city with raised sword from the centre of The Broadway, by Hamo Thornycroft and the modern striking Horse and Rider by Dame Elizabeth Frink at the entrance to the Law Courts.

The novelist Jane Austen died in Winchester on 18 July 1817 and is buried in the cathedral. While staying in Winchester from mid-August to October 1819, the Romantic poet John Keats wrote "Isabella", "St. Agnes' Eve", "To Autumn", "Lamia" and parts of "Hyperion" and the five-act poetic tragedy "Otho The Great".

In 2013, businesses involved in the housing market were reported by a local newspaper as saying that the city's architectural and historical interest, and its fast links to other towns and cities, had led Winchester to become one of the most expensive and desirable areas of the country and ranked Winchester as one of the least deprived areas in England and Wales.

Geography
Winchester is situated on a bed of Cretaceous lower chalk with small areas of clay and loam soil, inset with combined clay and rich sources of fuller's earth.

Climate
As with the rest of the UK, Winchester experiences an oceanic climate (Köppen Cfb). The nearest Met Office station is in Martyr Worthy, just outside the city.

Governance

From 1835 to 1974, Winchester was governed as a municipal borough of Hampshire. Until 1902 the city's affairs were also administered partly by its parishes: St Lawrence, St Mary Kalendar, St Maurice, St Michael, St Peter Colebrook, St Swithin, St Thomas, St John, St Bartholomew Hyde, Milland, St Faith, and St Peter Cheesehill, and its extra-parochial areas: Cathedral Precincts, St Mary's College Precincts, St Cross Hospital Precinct, and Wolvesey. Historically, the south of the city had come under the "Liberty of the Soke", and was thereby self-governing to a large extent. Since 1974 the city has been governed as part of the wider City of Winchester district of Hampshire. The district has 16 electoral wards, Five of these cover the area of the city itself: St Barnabas, St Paul, St Luke, St Bartholomew, and St Michael; they have three councillors each apart from St Luke, which is a two-member ward. For Hampshire County Council elections, the City of Winchester district is made up of 7 wards, with Winchester Westgate and Winchester Eastgate covering the city itself.

The current ward boundaries were adopted in 2016, when all seats were up for election. Since then, Winchester City Council elections take place in three out of every four years, with one third of the councillors elected in each election. From the 2006 election until the 2010 election the council was led by Conservatives. In 2010 it was briefly controlled by the Liberal Democrats, before being controlled by the Conservatives again from 2011 until 2019, when the Liberal Democrats took control.

Winchester is currently represented in the House of Commons by Steve Brine, of the Conservatives, who in the 2010 General Election beat Martin Tod, the Liberal Democrat candidate, by 3048 votes (a margin of 5.4%). Mark Oaten had previously won the seat for the Liberal Democrats during the 1997 general election in which he defeated Gerry Malone, a Health Minister in John Major's Conservative Government who had held the seat since 1992. Brine was re-elected in 2015 and in 2017. In 2019 he briefly sat as an Independent before being re-elected as a Conservative in the 2019 election.

The Mayor of Winchester currently exists as a ceremonial role, but dates back at least as far as the late 12th century. The mayoral term length is currently one year.

Landmarks

Cathedral

Winchester Cathedral was originally built in 1079 and remains the longest Gothic cathedral in Europe. It contains much fine architecture spanning the 11th to the 16th centuries and is the place of interment of numerous Bishops of Winchester (such as William of Wykeham), Anglo-Saxon monarchs (such as Egbert of Wessex) and later monarchs such as King Canute and William Rufus. It was once an important pilgrimage centre and housed the shrine of Saint Swithun. The ancient Pilgrims' Way to Canterbury begins at Winchester. The plan of the earlier Old Minster is laid out in the grass adjoining the cathedral. The New Minster (the original burial place of Alfred the Great and Edward the Elder) once stood beside it. The cathedral has a girls choir and a boys choir, who sing regularly in the cathedral.

Winchester Cathedral Close contains a number of historic buildings from the time when the cathedral was also a priory. Of particular note is the Deanery, which dates back to the 13th century. It was originally the Prior's House, and was the birthplace of Arthur, Prince of Wales in 1486. Not far away is Cheyney Court, a mid 15th-century timber-framed house incorporating the Porter's Lodge for the Priory Gate. It was the Bishop's court house.

The earliest hammer-beamed building still standing in England is situated in the Cathedral Close, next to the Dean's garden. It is known as the Pilgrims' Hall, as it was part of the hostelry used to accommodate the many pilgrims to Saint Swithun's shrine. Left-overs from the lavish banquets of the Priors (the monastic predecessors of the later Deans) would be given to the pilgrims, who were welcome to spend the night in the hall. It is thought by Winchester City Council to have been built in 1308. Now part of The Pilgrims' School, the hall is used by the school for assemblies in the morning, drama lessons, plays, orchestral practices, Cathedral Waynflete rehearsals, the school's Senior Commoners' Choir rehearsals etc.

Entrance for pedestrians to the North garth of the cathedral is via the Norman arches of Saint Maurice's tower, in the High Street.

Wolvesey Castle and Palace

Wolvesey Castle was the Norman bishop's palace, dating from 1110, but standing on the site of an earlier Saxon structure. It was enhanced by Henry de Blois during the Anarchy of his brother King Stephen's reign. He was besieged there for some days. In the 16th century, Queen Mary Tudor and King Philip II of Spain were guests just before their wedding in the cathedral. The building is now a ruin (maintained by English Heritage), but the chapel was incorporated into the new palace built in the 1680s, only one wing of which survives.

Castle

Winchester is well known for the Great Hall of its castle, which was built in the 12th century. The Great Hall was rebuilt sometime between 1222 and 1235, and still exists in this form. It is famous for King Arthur's Round Table, which has hung in the hall from at least 1463. The table actually dates from the 13th century, and as such is not contemporary to Arthur. Despite this it is still of considerable historical interest and attracts many tourists. The table was originally unpainted, but was painted for King Henry VIII in 1522. The names of the legendary Knights of the Round Table are written around the edge of the table surmounted by King Arthur on his throne. Opposite the table are Prince Charles's 'Wedding Gates'. In the grounds of the Great Hall is a recreation of a medieval garden. Apart from the hall, only a few excavated remains of the stronghold survive among the modern Law Courts. The buildings were supplanted by the adjacent King's House, now incorporated into the Peninsula Barracks where there are five military museums. (The training that used to be carried out at the barracks is now done by the Army Training Regiment Winchester, based at the Sir John Moore Barracks,  outside the city).

Hospital of St Cross

The almshouses and vast Norman chapel of the Hospital of St Cross were founded just outside the city centre by Henry de Blois in the 1130s. Since at least the 14th century, and still available today, a 'wayfarer's dole' of ale and bread has been handed out there. It was supposedly instigated to aid pilgrims on their way to Canterbury.

City museum
The City Museum, located on the corner of Great Minster Street and The Square, contains much information on the history of Winchester. Early examples of Winchester measures of standard capacity are on display. The museum was one of the first purpose-built museums to be constructed outside London. Local items featured include the Roman Venta Belgarum gallery, and some genuine period shop interiors taken from the nearby High Street. Other places of cultural interest include the Westgate Museum (which showcases various items of weaponry), and the Historic Resources Centre, which holds many records related to the history of the city. In 2014 ownership of the City museum was transferred to the Hampshire Cultural Trust as part of a larger transfer of museums from Hampshire County Council and Winchester City Council.

Other buildings

Other historic buildings include the Guildhall dating from 1871 in the Gothic revival style, the Royal Hampshire County Hospital, designed by William Butterfield, and Winchester City Mill, one of the city's several water mills driven by the River Itchen that runs through the city centre. The mill has recently been restored, and is again milling corn by water power. It is owned by the National Trust.

Castle Hill is the location of the Council Chamber for Hampshire County Council.

Between Jewry Street and St Peter's Street is St Peter's Catholic Church. It was built in 1924 and designed by Frederick Walters. Next to it is Milner Hall, built in the 1780s it was the first Catholic church to be consecrated since 1558.

Painted bollards

A series of 24 bollards on the corner of Great Minster Street and The Square were painted in the style of famous artists, or with topical scenes, by The Colour Factory between 2005 and 2012 at the behest of Winchester City Council.()

Education

State-funded schools

Primary schools
Winchester has a variety of Church of England primary schools, including both state and private provision schools. St Peters Catholic Primary School had the highest SATS results, after achieving a perfect score of 300 in 2011.

Secondary schools
There are four state comprehensive secondary schools in Winchester; the Henry Beaufort School, Kings' School Winchester, and The Westgate School are all situated in the city. A fourth state school, the Osborne School, a community special school is also located in Winchester.

Independent schools

Independent junior/preparatory schools are The Pilgrims' School Winchester, the Prince's Mead School and Twyford School, which is just outside the city and claims to be the oldest preparatory school in the United Kingdom. There are two major independent senior schools in Winchester, St Swithun's (a day and boarding school for girls from nursery to sixth form) and Winchester College, a boys' public school. Both schools often top the examination result tables for the city and county.

Special schools
Osborne School is a state-funded special school for pupils aged 11 to 19 which is located in Winchester. Shepherds Down Special School is a state funded special school for pupils aged 4 to 11, located just outside of the city in the boundaries of Compton.

Tertiary, further and higher education
The University of Winchester (formerly King Alfred's College) is a public university based in Winchester and the surrounding area. It is ranked 10th for teaching excellence in The Times and The Sunday Times 2016 Good University Guide, with a 92% rating, and fourth for student satisfaction in England in the National Student Survey 2015. The university origins go back as far as 1840—originally as a Diocesan teacher training centre. King Alfred's, the main campus, is located on a purpose built campus near the city centre. The West Downs campus is a short walk away, and houses student facilities and accommodation and the business school.

The Winchester School of Art was founded in the 1860s as an independent institution and is now a school of the University of Southampton. The School of Art is complemented by the University of Southampton's Erasmus Park student accommodation in Winnall.

Peter Symonds College is a college that serves Winchester. It began as a Grammar School for boys in 1897, and became a co-educational sixth form college in 1974.

Sport
Winchester has Winchester City FC who currently play in the Southern League and Winchester Castle FC, who have played in the Hampshire League since 1971. The local Saturday football league, the Winchester & District League, folded in 2010.

Winchester City Flyers are a girls and ladies football club established in 1996 with nearly 200 members, playing from U9 to ladies football. They play in the Southern Region Women's Football League.

The St Cross Symondians Cricket Club is one of the first cricket clubs in Hampshire, and, with 5 men's sides, 2 women's sides, a successful junior's side, and weekend sides, is one of the largest as well.

Winchester has a rugby union team, Winchester RFC, and an athletics club, Winchester and District AC. The city has a field hockey club, Winchester Hockey Club.

Lawn bowls is played at several clubs. The oldest bowling green belongs to Friary Bowling Club (first used in 1820), while the oldest bowls club is Hyde Abbey Bowling Club (established in 1812). Riverside Indoor Bowling Club remains open during the winter months.

There are three 18-hole golf courses. Royal Winchester Golf Club is on downland adjacent to the Clarendon Way. John Henry Taylor was the club professional when winning the Open Championship in 1894 and 1895, and there is a room with memorabilia named after him. Hockley Golf Club is located on St Catherine's Hill. South Winchester Golf Club is another downland course, designed by David Thomas and Peter Alliss. The club was established in 1993.

Winchester College invented and gave its name to Winchester College Football.

Transport

Road
Winchester is located near the M3 motorway and at the meeting of the A34, A31, A3090 and A272 roads. Once a major traffic bottleneck, the city still suffers from congestion at peak times. It is just to the south of the A303 and A30.

Roman road
A Roman road originating in Salisbury ends in Winchester. The road is now a recreational footpath known as the Clarendon Way.

Bus services

Local, rural and Park and Ride bus services are provided by Stagecoach South, who run to Andover, Alton, Basingstoke, Petersfield, Romsey and Fareham. Bluestar provide services to Eastleigh and Southampton. Many services are subsidised by Hampshire County Council and community transport schemes are available in areas without a regular bus service. National Express coaches provide services mainly to Bournemouth, Poole, Portsmouth and London.

Megabus also provide long-distance services.

Rail
Winchester railway station is served by South Western Railway trains from London Waterloo, Weymouth, Portsmouth and Southampton, as well as by CrossCountry between Bournemouth, and either Manchester or Newcastle via Birmingham. Historically it was also served by a line to London via Alton, which partially survives as the Watercress Line. The closure of this line removed an alternative route between London and Winchester when, due to engineering works or other reasons, the main line was temporarily unusable. There was a second station called Winchester Chesil served by the Didcot, Newbury and Southampton Railway, this closed in the 1960s.  This line provided a link to the Midlands and the North, bypassing the present longer route through Reading.

Law courts
Winchester Combined Court Centre hosts both the Crown Court and the County Court. It is administered by Her Majesty's Courts Service, an executive agency of the Ministry of Justice. Winchester is a first-tier court centre and is visited by High Court judges for criminal and for civil cases (in the District Registry of the High Court). One of the most high-profile cases to be heard here was the murder trial of Rosemary West in 1995.

Winchester has a separate district probate registry, which is part of the High Court. This court is separate from the main court establishment at the top of Winchester High Street and deals only with probate matters.

There is a heavily populated Victorian prison, HMP Winchester, opposite the hospital, on the B3040 heading up west from the town centre.

Media and culture

Since 1974 Winchester has hosted the annual Hat Fair, a celebration of street theatre that includes performances, workshops, and gatherings at several venues around the city.

Winchester is the home of Blue Apple Theatre, a theatre company that supports performers with learning disabilities to develop theatre, dance and film productions. It won the Queen's Award for Voluntary Service in 2012. Founded in 1997, Platform 4 is a National performance and visual arts company based in Winchester.

Winchester hosts one of the UK's larger farmers' markets, with about 100 stalls. The market takes place on the second and last Sunday of the month in the city centre. The city also hosts the annual Winchester Cathedral Christmas Market, which runs from mid-November to just before Christmas Day.

Four newspapers are published for Winchester. The weekly paid-for Hampshire Chronicle, which started out in 1772 reporting national and international news, now concentrates on Winchester and the surrounding area. The Southern Daily Echo mostly concerns Southampton, but does also feature Winchester. It has an office shared with sister paper the Hampshire Chronicle. The Mid-Hants Observer is a free, weekly independent paper for Winchester and nearby villages. Its sister paper, the weekly Hampshire Independent, which covers the whole county, is also based in Winchester. The free Winchester News Extra closed in 2017. Winchester had its own radio station, Win FM, from October 1999 to October 2007.

In October 2006, the Channel 4 television programme The Best And Worst Places To Live In The UK, the city was celebrated as the "Best Place in the UK to Live in: 2006". In March 2016, Winchester was named as the best place to live in Britain by the "Sunday Times Best Places To Live" guide.

International relations

Winchester is twinned with:
Laon, Aisne, Hauts-de-France, France

The Winchester district is twinned with
Giessen, Hesse, Germany

Winchester, Virginia, is named after the English city, whose Mayor has a standing invitation to be a part of the American city's Shenandoah Apple Blossom Festival. Winchester also gave its name (Frenchified to Bicêtre) to a suburb of Paris, from a manor built there by John of Pontoise, Bishop of Winchester, at the end of the 13th century. It is now the commune of Le Kremlin-Bicêtre.

See also
List of people from Winchester
Winchester Hat Fair
Winchester Hoard

Notes

References

External links

Winchester City Council
www.geograph.co.uk: photos of Winchester and surrounding area

 
Capitals of former nations
Towns in Hampshire
County towns in England
Former national capitals
Unparished areas in Hampshire
City of Winchester